News to Me is an American television program on HLN hosted by Eric Lanford.

"News To Me" was canceled in March 2009 after two years on the air.  It had formerly been broadcast Saturday at 7:30PM & 9:30PM ET.  Sunday at 12:30AM, 5:30AM, 7:30PM & 9:30PM ET.  Monday at 12:30AM & 5:30AM.  The program consisted of user-generated video clips and reports uploaded through iReport.com, in addition to Blip.tv, Jumpcut.com, and Revver. The program was the first on cable news television to focus on user reports vs. actual reporting by the television network itself.

Issues with Jane Velez-Mitchell has replaced the show.

References

CNN Headline News original programming
2000s American television news shows
2007 American television series debuts
2009 American television series endings